The 2017 season is Sukhothai's 2nd season in the Thai League T1  since 2016.

Thailand Champions Cup
The 2017 Thailand Champions Cup. It features SCG Muangthong United, the winners of the 2016 Thai League, and Sukhothai, the winners of the 2016 Thai FA Cup. It was played at Supachalasai Stadium.

Thai League

Thai FA Cup

Thai League Cup

AFC Champions League

Qualifying rounds

Squad goals statistics

Scorers ranking

Transfers
First Thai footballer's market is opening on December 14, 2016 to January 28, 2017
Second Thai footballer's market is opening on June 3, 2017 to June 30, 2017

In

Out

Loan in

References

External links
 Official website

Sukhothai F.C. seasons
Association football in Thailand lists
SUK